John O'Dwyer (born 17 September 1991) is an Irish hurler who plays for Tipperary Senior Championship club Killenaule and previously played at inter-county level with the Tipperary senior hurling team. He usually lines out as a centre-forward.

Playing career

Cork Institute of Technology

O'Dwyer studied at the Cork Institute of Technology and joined the senior hurling team in his second year at the institute. On 1 March 2014, he top scored for the team with five points when CIT suffered a 0-17 to 0-12 defeat by the Waterford Institute of Technology in the Fitzgibbon Cup final.

Killenaule

O'Dwyer joined the Killenaule club at a young age and played in all grades at juvenile and underage levels. He was just 16 years old when he joined the club's senior teams as a dual player in 2008.

On 30 August 2008, O'Dwyer lined out at right corner-forward when Killenaule faced Ballingarry in the South Tipperary Championship final. He scored 1-06 and ended the game with a winners' medal following the 3-15 to 1-10 victory.

On 2 September 2013, O'Dwyer was selected at centre-forward when Killenaule lined out against Carrick Swans in the South Tipperary Championship final. He top scored with 0-14 and claimed a second winners' medal after a 1-22 to 2-16 victory.

Killenaule qualified for a second successive South Tipperary Championship final on 23 August 2014 with Mullinahone providing the opposition. O'Dwyer scored nine points from centre-forward and collected a third winners' medal following the 0-21 to 2-13 victory.

Tipperary

Minor and under-21

O'Dwyer first played for Tipperary as a 16-year-old when he joined the minor team during the 2008 Munster Championship. He made his first appearance for the team on 30 April 2008 and scored two points in the 3-21 to 1-12 defeat of Limerick. On 13 July 2008, O'Dwyer came on as a substitute for Paddy Murphy when Tipperary suffered a 0-19 to 0-18 defeat by Cork in the Munster final.

O'Dwyer was again eligible for the minor grade for a second and final season in 2009. On 12 July 2009, he top scored for the team with 1-06 in an 0-18 to 1-13 defeat by Waterford in the Munster final.

O'Dwyer was drafted onto the Tipperary under-21 in advance of the 2010 Munster Championship. He made his debut for the team on 14 July 2010 and scored a point from full-forward in a 2-17 to 0-21 extra-time defeat of Cork. On 28 July 2010, O'Dwyer won a Munster Championship medal after scoring three points in Tipperary's 1-22 to 1-17 defeat of Clare in the final. He was switched to left corner-forward for the All-Ireland final against Galway on 11 September 2010. O'Dwyer ended the game with an All-Ireland medal after scoring 1-03 in the 5-22 to 0-12 victory.

O'Dwyer was appointed captain of the under-21 team for the 2012 Munster Championship. On 8 August 2012, he scored 1-07 when Tipperary suffered a 1-16 to 1-14 defeat by Clare in the Munster final.

Senior

O'Dwyer was added to the Tipperary senior team in advance of the 2013 National League. He made his first appearance for the team on 23 February 2013 and scored three points from centre-forward in a 0-26 to 1-11 defeat by Cork. On 5 May 2013, O'Dwyer came on as a substitute for Eoin Kelly at full-forward when Tipperary suffered a 2-17 to 0-20 defeat by Kilkenny in the National League final.

On 4 May 2014, O'Dwyer scored 1-03 from left wing-forward when Tipperary suffered a 2-25 to 1-27 defeat by Kilkenny in a second successive National League final. On 7 September 2014, he was again selected at left wing-forward for the All-Ireland final against Kilkenny. O'Dwyer scored seven points, however, his last-minute 97-metre free was ruled wide by Hawk-Eye and the game ended in a 1-28 to 3-22 draw. He was again selected at left wing-forward for the replay on 27 September 2014, however, he ended the game on the losing side following a 2-17 t 2-14 defeat. O'Dwyer ended the season by winning an All-Star award.

On 12 July 2015, O'Dwyer lined out at right corner-forward in his first Munster final. He scored 0-05 from play and ended the game with a Munster Championship medal following Tipperary's 0-21 to 0-16 defeat of Waterford.

On 19 June 2016, O'Dwyer received a straight red card after striking Limerick's Richie English in the 14th minute of Tipperary's 3-12 to 1-16 Munster semi-final victory. The red card meant that he missed the 5-19 to 0-13 defeat of Waterford in the final. O'Dwyer was back on the starting fifteen at right corner-forward for the All-Ireland final against Kilkenny on 4 September 2016. He scored 1-05 from play and ended the game with an All-Ireland medal following the 2-29 to 2-20 victory. 

On 23 April 2017, O'Dwyer lined out at full-forward when Tipperary faced Galway in the National League final. He scored a point from play before being substituted in the 3-21 to 0-14 defeat.

O'Dwyer played in a second successive National League final on 8 April 2018. After starting the game on the bench, he was introduced as a substitute for Michael Breen at left corner-forward but ended the game on the losing side following a 2-23 to 2-17 defeat by Kilkenny.

On 30 June 2019, O'Dwyer scored a point from centre-forward when Tipperary suffered a 2-26 to 2-14 defeat by Limerick in the Munster final. On 18 August 2019, he was selected at right wing-forward when Tipperary faced Kilkenny in the All-Ireland final. O'Dwyer scored 1-02 from play and collected a second All-Ireland winners' medal following the 3-25 to 0-20 victory. He ended the season by receiving an All-Star nomination.

In February 2023, O'Dwyer announced his retirement from inter-county hurling.

Munster

O'Dwyer was added to the Munster team in advance of the 2016 Railway Cup. He made his first appearance for the team on 11 December 2016 and scored two points from right corner-forward in a 3-21 to 0-15 defeat of Ulster. On 15 December 2016, O'Dwyer won a Railway Cup medal following a 2-20 to 2-16 defeat of Leinster in the final.

Career statistics

Honours

Killenaule
South Tipperary Senior Hurling Championship (3): 2008, 2013, 2015
South Tipperary Senior Football Championship (2): 2012, 2014

Tipperary
 All-Ireland Senior Hurling Championship (2): 2016, 2019  
 Munster Senior Hurling Championship (2): 2015, 2016
 All-Ireland Under-21 Hurling Championship (1): 2010
 Munster Under-21 Hurling Championship (1): 2010

Munster
Railway Cup (1): 2016

Individual
GAA GPA All Stars Awards (1): 2014
The Sunday Game Team of the Year (1): 2014

References

External links

John O'Dwyer profile at the Tipperary GAA website

1991 births
Living people
All-Ireland Senior Hurling Championship winners
CIT hurlers
Killenaule hurlers
Tipperary inter-county hurlers
Munster inter-provincial hurlers